Luc Vandal (born 1955 in Saint-Hyacinthe, Quebec) is a Canadian Quebecois film producer. He is most noted as a producer of Denis Villeneuve's 2000 film Maelström, which won the Genie Award for Best Picture at the 21st Genie Awards and the Jutra Award for Best Film at the 3rd Jutra Awards.

Filmography
 CSN, 1996
 The Haven (La conciergerie), 1997
 When I Will Be Gone (L'âge de braise), 1998
 Matroni and Me (Matroni et moi), 1999
 Life After Love (La vie après l'amour), 2000
 Maelström, 2000
 Tar Angel (L'Ange de goudron), 2001
 Chaos and Desire (La Turbulence des fluides), 2002
 How My Mother Gave Birth to Me During Menopause (Comment ma mère accoucha de moi durant sa ménopause), 2003
 Father and Sons (Père et fils), 2003
 Seducing Doctor Lewis (La Grande séduction), 2003
 Life with My Father (La vie avec mon père), 2005
 Saint Martyrs of the Damned (Saints-Martyrs-des-Damnés), 2005
 The Chinese Botanist's Daughters (Les filles du botaniste), 2006
 The Secret Life of Happy People (La vie secrète des gens heureux), 2006
 Borderline, 2008
 Romaine 30° Below (Romaine par moins 30), 2009
 Through the Mist (Dédé à travers les brumes), 2009
 Crying Out (À l'origine d'un cri), 2010
 Another Silence, 2011
 Wetlands (Marécages), 2011
 Liverpool, 2012
 The Day of the Crows (Le jour des corneilles), 2012
 Bad Seeds (Les mauvaises herbes), 2016
 Infiltration (Le problème d'infiltration), 2017
 Goddess of the Fireflies (La déesse des mouches à feu), 2018

References

External links

Film producers from Quebec
1955 births
Living people
Canadian Screen Award winners
People from Saint-Hyacinthe
French Quebecers